Adventures of Power is a 2008 American adventure comedy film written and directed by Ari Gold, starring Gold, Michael McKean, Jane Lynch, Shoshannah Stern, Chiu Chi Ling, and Adrian Grenier and featuring Steven Williams, Jimmy Jean-Louis, Annie Golden and Nick Kroll, with a cameo performance by Rush drummer Neil Peart. The soundtrack includes original songs by Ethan Gold and hits by Rush, Mr. Mister, Judas Priest, Phil Collins, Dazz Band, Loverboy, Bow Wow Wow and Woody Guthrie. The film premiered at the 2008 Sundance Film Festival and made its European debut at the 2008 Karlovy Vary International Film Festival. It was released theatrically in 2009 by Variance Films and on DVD/VOD by Phase 4 Films.

Plot
In the fictional small town of Lode, New Mexico, just about all of the male townsfolk work for a copper mining plant, including Power. Power (whose name was given to him by his father so he could grow up strong) lives with his Aunt Joanie and is always shown air-drumming to music, even when at work. It turns out he air-drums because his father never could afford to buy him drums.  He does his air-drumming at a talent show in a local bar, where his only praise comes from a young boy. Unfortunately, the mining plant is poised to strike, but Power is fired for a mishap that is one too many just beforehand, therefore he cannot join in.  Disappointed, he stumbles upon an advert for an underground air-drumming place about forty miles south of them just across the border in Mexico. The boy lends him his dirt bike to get there, but he ends up losing it while there.

He joins in, playing a Rush song without sitting down, which makes him nearly pass out. When the police raid the place, he ducks everyone and gets away.  Before heading back, he is given an invitation to join a group of air-drummers in Newark, New Jersey, so armed with his music and cereal, he hitchhikes his way to Newark.

Once he gets there, he meets the crew, headed by Carlos, a former drummer who now has hooks in place of both of his hands (it is never explained why), and he is given a job and a place to crash at a local Chinese restaurant owned by Michael Fong. Living upstairs from the restaurant is Samantha, a religious fanatic, and her deaf daughter, Annie.  Annie does take an initial liking to Power, but her mother objects to it, and even eventually threatens to move to Florida when she catches them making out.  Before doing so, Annie reveals that her mother used to be a groupie, and she went deaf in her youth from not wearing hearing protection while on stage with the bands. (A picture she shows Power has her at a very young age on stage next to an amp crying.)

A subplot involves a rich young guy called Dallas Houston (or Dallas H.) who does music videos and has his own product lines of every sorts. He has a secret admiration for air-drumming that his father, who happens to own the mining company that runs the Lode plant, abhors.

Power works hard with the new crew for the upcoming air-drumming competition, eventually overcoming his shortcomings, but when he finds out the striking miners were assaulted by hired thugs and his dad is hospitalized, he bails on them and calls him, and they seem to make amends.

Carlos decides the group must go on without Power, but as they are performing their group song, one of the members is disqualified for how he's playing, which causes the others to start a fight and gets them DQed as well.

Power, who comes in just in time for the solo competition, is the only one left eligible on their team. He plays along with Dallas H. and another female to Tom Sawyer in the finals.  The girl drops out early, and after Power's defective stool breaks and leaves him flat on the floor, it seems as though he would be out as well.

However, he finds out Annie is in the crowd at the show when she tosses a Cheerio on stage right into his mouth. (She had earlier declared to her mother she couldn't go to Florida, and her mother, in sudden understanding, gives her a ticket to the air-drumming competition and says "Maybe Jesus was a rockstar.")

With renewed energy, Power jumps up and continues playing without a stool (much to Carlos's worry) and outlasts Dallas to win the competition.

He is presented the $2000 grand prize by Rush drummer Neil Peart (in a cameo appearance) and has him make the check out to the workers union of the copper plant. Power's dad, renewed by his son's victory and generosity, helps to resume fighting.

Awards
Official Selection, Sundance Film Festival
Official Selection, Karlovy-Vary International Film Festival
Audience Award, Best Feature, Vail Film Festival
Audience Award, Narrative Feature, Memphis Indie Film Festival
Grand Jury Prize, San Antonio Film Festival
Jury Prize, Best Feature, Fort Collins TriMedia Festival
Best Comedy, Philadelphia Independent Film Festival

Reception
Adventures of Power has received mixed reviews. , the film holds a 32% approval rating on Rotten Tomatoes, based on 19 reviews with an average rating of 3.73/10. On Metacritic, it has a score of 39/100, based on reviews from 9 critics, indicating "generally unfavorable reviews".

Home media
Adventures of Power was released on DVD in the United States on January 25, 2010, by Phase 4 Films.

The DVD extras include an exclusive interview and drum-off with Rush drummer Neil Peart; a music video starring Adrian Grenier (Entourage) as Dallas H.; deleted scenes featuring Jane Lynch (Glee) and more; Postcards from the Set, the story of the making of the film; fan videos, short films by Ari Gold; and trailers and commentary.

Soundtrack
The film features original songs by Ethan Gold and hits by Rush ("Tom Sawyer"), Mr. Mister ("Kyrie"), Judas Priest ("Hell Bent For Leather"), Phil Collins ("In The Air Tonight"), Dazz Band ("Let It Whip"), Loverboy ("Turn Me Loose"), Bow Wow Wow ("C·30 C·60 C·90 Go!"),  Heart ("Dreamboat Annie"), Ramblin' Jack Elliot ("Pastures of Plenty"), War Party ("This Land Was Ours") and Woody Guthrie.

The Adventures of Power original motion picture soundtrack contains the original songs by Ethan Gold that appear in the film. It also contains the Adventures of Power Story, 36 digital postcards that describe the making of the film.

The soundtrack was released on December 25, 2010, by Gold Records.

Track listing:
1. "The Beat of Our Mama's Heart"
2. "New Jersey Nights"
3. "Impossible Fantasy"
4. "No Drums"
5. "A Little Like You"
6. "Rainwalk"
7. "Dream Drum Solo"
8. "Crib Hip Hop Mashup"
9. "Trains"
10. "Cerealismo"
11. "Bring the Hammer Down / Blanda y Mojada"
12. "Hospital Lullaby"
13. "Tabla Conga Kit Workout"
14. "No Hands"
15. "Nahnu Wahad"
16. "Impossible Love"
17. "The Kiss"
18. "The People Want Peas"
19. "The Call"
20. "Lovin' Tonight"
21. "We Can't Beat Them"
22. "We Got a Job to Do"
23. "The Docks"
24. "The Drums of Bakir"
25. "I Can Feel You"
26. "The Dance Floor"
27. "Ecscape, Supposably"
28. "Showtunes"
29. "The Armpit of the Nation"
30. "Union Local 832"
31. "Memory"
32. "Bugle Call / Impossible Rainwalk"
33. "Who I Really Am"
34. "A Golden Sound"
35. "Grunge"
36. "Cap Medley"
37. "Possible Fantasy" 
38. "New Jersey Nights / Tabla Breakdown" 
39. "Impossible Fantasy Ballad"
40. "We Are Power"
Bonus: Digital Booklet – the Adventures of Power Story

References

External links
 Official website
 

2008 films
2008 comedy films
2008 independent films
2000s adventure comedy films
2000s American films
2000s comedy road movies
2000s English-language films
American adventure comedy films
American comedy road movies
American independent films
Films produced by Andrea Sperling
Films set in Mexico
Films set in New Jersey
Films set in New Mexico
Variance Films films